Boll weevil may refer to:

 Boll weevil, a beetle 
 Boll weevil (politics), an American political term used in the mid- and late-20th century 
 Boll Weevil (restaurant), a restaurant chain
 Boll Weevil Monument, a monument in Enterprise, Alabama
 Piedmont Boll Weevils, a minor league baseball team

Music
 "Boll Weevil" (song), a traditional blues song and a 1961 hit by Brook Benton
 "Bo Weevil", a 1956 Fats Domino song
 Bo Weavil Jackson, a blues musician
 The Bollweevils, an American punk band 
 "Boll Weevil", a song by The Presidents of the United States of America from the 1995 album The Presidents of the United States of America